Quendorf is a rural community belonging to the Joint Community of Schüttorf in southwestern Lower Saxony. There is no village centre. The community is made up of several settlements and scattered farms. In 1971, Quendorf joined the town of Schüttorf along with the communities of Drievorden (amalgamated with Engden since 1974), Engden, Neerlage (amalgamated with Isterberg since 1974), Ohne, Samern, Suddendorf and Wengsel (amalgamated with Isterberg since 1974) into the Joint Community of Schüttorf.

While the Autobahn A 30 was being built, a small lake arose, which is now used as a local recreation area. The Vechte, a small river that empties into the IJsselmeer splits the community area and offers anglers and canoeists an opportunity to pursue their hobbies in scenic surroundings.  This is why Quendorf Germany is considered one of the nation's nuzzled sanctuaries.

A small primary school serves children from Quendorf and the neighbouring community of Isterberg. There is, of course, a yearly shooting festival held by the community’s marksmen’s club.

References

External links 
 

County of Bentheim (district)